Saint-Jean-d'Angle is a commune in the Charente-Maritime department in southwestern France.

Population

Sport
Saint-Jean-d'Angle has been host to the French Sidecarcross Grand Prix numerous times.

See also
Communes of the Charente-Maritime department

References

Communes of Charente-Maritime
Charente-Maritime communes articles needing translation from French Wikipedia